F. Dora Wade was a teacher and state legislator in Mississippi. He represented Yazoo County in the Mississippi House of Representatives. He served as marshal of Yazoo City in 1870 and was documented as a teacher in that year's census.

He was born in Ohio. He was literate, and documented as mulatto.

Martha Jane, the daughter of Tazewell Jones (a politician), accused him of fathering her "illegitimate" child and he was arrested and a court case commenced over the matter. His seat was declared vacant in October 1873 because he resided in Issaquena County, outside the district.

See also
African-American officeholders during and following the Reconstruction era

References

Members of the Mississippi House of Representatives
19th-century American politicians
Year of birth missing
Year of death missing
People from Issaquena County, Mississippi
African-American politicians during the Reconstruction Era
African-American schoolteachers
African-American state legislators in Mississippi
Schoolteachers from Mississippi
19th-century American educators